The Hitachi High-Tech Cougars are a basketball team based in Hitachinaka, Ibaraki, playing in the Women's Japan Basketball League.

Notable players
Reika Takahashi
Kumiko Yamada

Coaches
Koju Munakata
Toru Shioya
Natsumi Yabuuchi
Tomohide Utsumi
Sachiko Ishikawa (asst)

Venues
Hitachinaka General Gymnasium
Kamisu Bosai Arena

References

External links
Official website

Basketball teams in Japan
Basketball teams established in 1961
1961 establishments in Japan